Cannonsburg is an unincorporated community in Hancock County, in the U.S. state of Ohio.

History
Cannonsburg was laid out in 1839. A post office called Cannonsburgh was established in 1840, the name was changed to Cannonsburg in 1894, and the post office closed in 1902.

References

See also
Dellroy, Ohio, a village once known as Cannonsburg.

Unincorporated communities in Hancock County, Ohio
Unincorporated communities in Ohio